This is a partial list of hotels in Beijing.

Hotels in Beijing

 Beijing Hotel
 China World Hotel, Beijing
 Diaoyutai State Guesthouse
 Fairmont Beijing
 Grand Hyatt Beijing
 Jingxi Hotel
 Lusongyuan Hotel
 Minzu Hotel
 Morgan Plaza

See also
 Lists of hotels – an index of hotel list articles on Wikipedia

References

External links
 

 
Hotels
Beijing